Risc vs. Reward is compilation EP from drum and bass artist Photek. It combines tracks from his previous EPs The Hidden Camera and Ni-Ten-Ichi-Ryu.

Track listing
 "K.J.Z." – 7:47
 "The Hidden Camera" – 6:47
 "The Hidden Camera (Static Mix)" – 6:18
 "Hybrid" – 5:15
 "Ni-Ten-Ichi-Ryu (Two Swords Technique)" – 5:56
 "The Fifth Column" – 7:08

Ni-Ten-Ichi-Ryu (Two Swords Technique)
"Ni-Ten-Ichi-Ryu (Two Swords Technique)" featured in the film Blade (1998).

Released as a single in 1997, the song reached #37 on the UK Singles Chart.

See also
Niten Ichi-ryū – a koryū (ancient school), transmitting a style of classical Japanese swordsmanship conceived by the warrior Miyamoto Musashi.

References

1997 EPs
Photek albums
Astralwerks EPs